Landese (Maritime Gascon, or parlar negre, which means "black speech" in English) is a dialect of the Gascon language, spoken in the south-west part of Landes of Gascony, part of Chalosse and around Bayonne (Aquitaine, metropolitan France). Landese is an endangered dialect as are several other Occitan languages.

Reorganization of vowel phonemes
The main feature of Landese is its propensity to pronounce certain vowels with more roundedness (and if necessary, in a more closed or more centralized manner). Thus there is a migration of phonemes from the general Gascon to new phonemes in Landese.

Works
The poet, novelist and essayist Bernat Manciet (1923 - 2005) remained faithful to the local Gascon speaking of his native Landes region where he lived a large part of his life.

The erudite Vincent Foix (1857 - 1932) has written a dictionary on the Gascon from Chalosse and other parts of Landes.

Sources
Part of content in this edit is based on a partial translation from the existing French Wikipedia article at :fr:Parlar negre (see its history for attribution) which cites the following sources:
 Philippe Lartigue, Le vocalisme du gascon maritime, D.E.A. de Sciences du Langage, University of Toulouse-Le Mirail, June 2004
 Pierre Moureau, Dictionnaire du patois de La Teste, 1870; 2nd edition: Dictionnaire gascon-français, français-gascon: suivant les parlers maritimes, Princi Negre, 1997, 
 Pierre Rectoran, Le gascon maritime de Bayonne et du Bas-Adour, Jean Curutchet, 1996,

See also
 Béarnese dialect
 Gascony

References

Gascon language
Landes (department)